"Yalla" is a song recorded by Kosovo-Albanian rapper Capital T featuring German-Ukrainian rapper Jocker Bra. The song was entirely written by the rappers themselves and produced by Albanian producers BO Beatz and Ditty Beatz with the mastering process handled by Jumpa and Lorenc Alija Avaxus.

The official music video for the song was officially uploaded on the 21 December 2019 onto YouTube in order to accompany the single's release. It is an animated music video which portrays two illustrations of the rappers while driving a Mercedes-Benz.

Background

Composition 

"Yalla" was written by Capital T and Jocker Bra and produced by Albanian producers BO Beatz and Ditty Beatz. Jumpa and Lorenc Alija Avaxus were additionally hired for the song's mastering process. It marks the second time that both artists have collaborated musically on a recording after the rapper was featured on the single "Wann Dann" in 2018. The song was composed in  time and is performed in the key of B minor in common time with a tempo of 148 beats per minute. It was mostly written mostly in the Albanian language though the lyrics of Jocker Bra are in the German language.

Music video 

The accompanying music video for "Yalla" was premiered onto the YouTube channel of Capital T on the 21 December 2019. It was released on different platforms as a single one day after on 22 December 2019 in various countries.

Release history

References 

2019 singles
2019 songs
Capital T songs 
Albanian-language songs
German-language songs
German-language Albanian songs
Song recordings produced by Jumpa
Song recordings produced by Rzon